Maccabee Athletic Club (MAH-KAH-Bee) was an American athletic club based in Los Angeles, California. The primary activity of the club was Maccabee Los Angeles Soccer Club, a team which competed professionally in the Greater Los Angeles Soccer League and the CONCACAF Champions League (CONCACAF Champions Cup). The soccer club is notable for appearing in the Lamar Hunt U.S. Open Cup (National Challenge Cup) final seven times in its eleven-year history, becoming one of only two teams to win the competition five times.

History

Maccabee Los Angeles Soccer Club was formed by a group of Israeli expatriates to serve as a recreational Sunday soccer team. The team began playing competitively in 1971 as part of the Greater Los Angeles Soccer League, with the addition of former Israeli national team players who had recently immigrated to the Los Angeles area. While the club used the Star of David and other Jewish symbols, the players came from various countries and many of them were not Jewish. They won the Triple Crown (Association Football) twice in 1977 and 1978 by winning the Greater Los Angeles Soccer League, California State Cup and the National Challenge Cup. They participated in the CONCACAF Champions Cup in 1978 but did not advance from the first round.
Maccabee Los Angeles played Bridgeport Vasco da Gama from Connecticut in the 1978 US Open Cup winning the
final at Giants Stadium in East Rutherford, New Jersey. The match was part of a double header with the New York Cosmos and the Tampa Bay Rowdies of the North American Soccer League in front of 30,000 fans. Maccabee Los Angeles ceased operations after the 1982 season but Maccabee Athletic Club is still in existence for youth players.

Honors
Lamar Hunt US Open Cup (National Challenge Cup)
Winner (5): 1973, 1975, 1977, 1978, 1981
Finalist (2): 1980, 1982
Triple Crown Winners: (2): 1977, 1978Greater Los Angeles Soccer League Winner (7): 1973, 1975, 1977, 1978, 1980, 1981, 1982CONCACAF Champions Cup''': 1974, 1978 (Did not advance).

Past rosters

National Challenge Cup 1973

National Challenge Cup 1975

National Challenge Cup 1977

National Challenge Cup 1978

National Challenge Cup 1980

National Challenge Cup 1981

National Challenge Cup 1982

National Challenge Cup results

1973 Maccabee Los Angeles 5 vs Cleveland Inter Italian 3
1975 Maccabee Los Angeles 1 vs New York Inter Giuliana 0
1977 Maccabee Los Angeles 5 vs Philadelphia German-Hungarians 1
1978 Maccabee Los Angeles 2 vs Bridgeport Vasco da Gama 0 (OT)
1980 New York Pancyprian-Freedoms 3 vs Maccabee Los Angeles 2
1981 Maccabee Los Angeles 5 vs Brooklyn Dodgers 1
1982 New York Pancyprian-Freedoms 4 vs Maccabee Los Angeles 3 (OT)

References

Maccabee Los Angeles
Jewish organizations based in the United States
Soccer clubs in Los Angeles
Los Angeles
1971 establishments in California
1982 disestablishments in California
Association football clubs established in 1971
Association football clubs disestablished in 1982
Diaspora soccer clubs in the United States
U.S. clubs in CONCACAF Champions' Cup
U.S. Open Cup winners